The 1924 Hammond Pros season was their fifth in the league. The team improved on their previous output of 1–5–1, winning two games. They finished tenth in the league.

Schedule

Standings

Players
 Dunc Annan
 George Berry
 Teddy Besta
 Sol Butler
 John Detwiler
 Guil Falcon
 Bill Fortune
 Wally Hess
 Ward Meese
 Ray Neal
 Russ Oltz
 Mace Roberts
 Eddie Robinson
 Frank Rydzewski
 Lenny Sachs
 Si Seyfrit
 Dick Stahlman
 Steve Sullivan
 Dave Tallant
 Lou Usher
 Rat Watson
 Ink Williams

References

Hammond Pros seasons
Hammond Pros
1924 in sports in Indiana